Functional grammar may refer to: 

 Functional linguistics, a range of functionally based approaches to linguistics
 Functional discourse grammar, grammar models developed by Simon C. Dik that explain how utterances are shaped based on the goals of language users
 Systemic functional grammar, a grammatical description developed by Michael Halliday
 Danish functional linguistics, a strand of functional linguistics associated with linguists at the University of Copenhagen
 Lexical functional grammar, a variety of generative grammar initiated by Joan Bresnan and Ronald Kaplan.
 Role and reference grammar, a model of grammar developed by William Foley and Robert Van Valin, Jr.